Hippothoon (Ancient Greek: Ἱπποθόων, -ωντος) or Hippothous is a figure in Greek mythology, often described as the King of Eleusis, succeeding to the throne after the death of Cercyon. He is the Attic hero and the eponym of the Athenian phyle called Hippothoontis (Ιπποθοωντίς).

Family 
Hippothoon was the son of Poseidon and Alope, Cercyon's daughter.

Mythology 
Although Cercyon had Alope buried alive, Poseidon turned her into the spring, Alope, near Eleusis. Hippothoon was stated to be present in the missions of Triptolemus and was mentioned along with Eumolpus as an Eleusinian hero who was worshiped according to honorary decrees dating to the 4th century BC. He was also described as the host of Demeter, instead of Celeus, during her wandering in search of Persephone.

According to Pausanias, a heroon was dedicated to him for worship by hereditarily assigned priests.

Notes

References 

 Gaius Julius Hyginus, Fabulae from The Myths of Hyginus translated and edited by Mary Grant. University of Kansas Publications in Humanistic Studies. Online version at the Topos Text Project.
 Pausanias, Description of Greece with an English Translation by W.H.S. Jones, Litt.D., and H.A. Ormerod, M.A., in 4 Volumes. Cambridge, MA, Harvard University Press; London, William Heinemann Ltd. 1918. . Online version at the Perseus Digital Library
 Pausanias, Graeciae Descriptio. 3 vols. Leipzig, Teubner. 1903.  Greek text available at the Perseus Digital Library.

Kings of Eleusis
Kings in Greek mythology
Greek mythological heroes
Children of Poseidon
Demigods in classical mythology
Eleusinian characters in Greek mythology